Charles-Armel Doubane (born 12 November 1966) is a Central African politician and diplomat who has been Minister of Foreign Affairs of the Central African Republic since 2016. He previously served as Minister of Education from 2006 to 2008 and as Permanent Representative to the United Nations from 2011 to 2013.

After standing unsuccessfully as a candidate in the 2015 presidential election, he was appointed as Minister of Foreign Affairs by President Faustin-Archange Touadera on 11 April 2016 and served in this capacity until December 2018.

Early life and education 
Doubane was born at Zemio on 12 November 1966. He is a graduate of the French “Ecole Nationale d’Administration” (ENA), of the Hague Academy of International Law, and of the University of Paris XI with a DEA in Public Law, of EUCLID (university) with a doctorate in international law.

Career
Under President Ange-Félix Patassé, Doubane was appointed to the government as Minister for Relations with Parliament on 18 February 1997, serving in that post until 1999. In the November 1998 parliamentary election, he was elected to the National Assembly of the Central African Republic as a candidate of the Alliance for Democracy and Progress (ADP) in Zemio constituency, receiving 67.58% of the vote. Speaking in January 1999, Doubane expressed concern about the presence in his constituency of Congolese soldiers who had fled across the border from Gbadolite to Zemio due to rebel attacks. He complained that the soldiers were abusing the population and urged the government to take action to get them out of the town.

Later, under Patassé's successor, François Bozizé, Doubane was Diplomatic Advisor to the President. He was again appointed to the government as Minister of National Education, Literacy, Higher Education, and Research on 31 January 2006. He served in that post until January 2008.

From 2008 to 2011, Doubane was Director Guarantor of the CAP Chimie SARL. Bozizé then appointed Doubane as Permanent Representative to the United Nations; he presented his credentials to UN Secretary-General Ban Ki-moon on 23 June 2011.

In March 2013, President Bozizé was ousted by Seleka, an alliance of rebel groups, and Michel Djotodia took power. On 31 March 2013, Doubane was appointed to the government as Minister of Foreign Affairs. However, Doubane did not take up his new post, remaining Permanent Representative to the UN. Léonie Banga-Bothy was instead appointed as Minister of Foreign Affairs in June 2013.

Doubane was a candidate in the December 2015 presidential election and supported the candidacy of Faustin-Archange Touadera for the run-off. After Touadera took office as President, he appointed Doubane as Minister of Foreign Affairs, African Integration, and Central Africans Abroad on 11 April 2016. He served in that post until December 2018.

Other activities 
Doubane is the author of Ma vie, ma vision pour le Centrafrique, published in 2015 prior to the presidential elections. Since 2013, he also served on the faculty for EUCLID, an intergovernmental university which has its historic headquarters in Bangui.

See also
List of foreign ministers in 2017
List of current foreign ministers

References

1966 births
Living people
Zande people
People from Haut-Mbomou
Government ministers of the Central African Republic
Foreign ministers of the Central African Republic
Permanent Representatives of the Central African Republic to the United Nations
Central African Republic diplomats
Members of the National Assembly (Central African Republic)